The Municipality of Russell – Binscarth is a rural municipality (RM) in the Parkland Region of Manitoba, Canada. It is located in the far western part of the province and shares a border with the neighbouring province of Saskatchewan.

History

It was incorporated on January 1, 2015, via the amalgamation of the RM of Russell, the Town of Russell, and the Village of Binscarth. It was formed as a requirement of The Municipal Amalgamations Act, which required that municipalities with a population less than 1,000 amalgamate with one or more neighbouring municipalities by 2015. The amalgamations were started by the government of Manitoba so that municipalities could reach the minimum population requirement of 1,000 in 1997 for incorporation as a municipality.

Communities
Binscarth
 Harrowby
 Johnson
 Millwood
 Russell (unincorporated urban community)

Demographics 

References 

Rural municipalities in Manitoba
2015 establishments in Manitoba
Manitoba municipal amalgamations, 2015
Populated places established in 2015